Matoska International IB World School is an elementary school (K-5) in White Bear Lake, Minnesota, United States which is more commonly known as Matoska International. As an International Baccalaureate (IB) World School, they are aligned with the IB organization's mission, IB Learner Profile, and the Minnesota state standards. Matoska began the process to become an IB school in 2010, when both Parkview and Centerpoint elementary schools closed and merged into Matoska then they become the average Midwest elementary schools

References

Educational institutions established in 2010
Public elementary schools in Minnesota
Schools in Ramsey County, Minnesota
2010 establishments in Minnesota
International Baccalaureate schools in Minnesota